Deng Yi (birth and death year unknown) was a government official and administrator who lived in the late Eastern Han dynasty of China. Deng Yi served under the warlord Liu Biao in Jing Province (covering present-day Hubei and Hunan). After the death of Liu Biao and his son Liu Cong's surrender to Cao Cao, Deng served as an official under Cao Cao.

Life

The 漢晉春秋 records that in 196, Deng advised Liu Biao not to form an alliance with Yuan Shao. Liu did not heed this advice and dismissed Deng from office.

In 208, Liu Biao died and his son Liu Cong surrendered to the rival warlord Cao Cao. Cao Cao appointed Deng as an official.

See also
 Lists of people of the Three Kingdoms

References

 漢晉春秋
 Chen, Shou (3rd century). Records of the Three Kingdoms (Sanguozhi).
 Fan, Ye (5th century). Book of the Later Han (Houhanshu).
 Luo, Guanzhong (14th century). Romance of the Three Kingdoms (Sanguo Yanyi).

Liu Biao and associates
Political office-holders in Hubei
Political office-holders in Hunan